Ivesia jaegeri, is an uncommon species of flowering plant in the rose family known by the common name Jaeger's mousetail, or Jaeger's ivesia.

It is native to the Mojave Desert in southwestern Nevada, and it is also known from two occurrences nearby in California. It grows in cracks and crevices in the limestone cliffs and slopes of the desert mountains.

Description
Ivesia jaegeri is a perennial herb that grows in matted clumps of glandular foliage. The leaves and thin, naked stems hang from their purchase on steep cliffs. Each leaf is a strip of oval-shaped green leaflets.

The stems bear inflorescences of clustered flowers. Each flower has triangular sepals with tiny oval-shaped yellow petals between them. The center of the flower contains twenty stamens and a few pistils.

External links
Jepson Manual Treatment
Photo gallery

jaegeri
Flora of Nevada
Flora of California
Natural history of the Mojave Desert
Flora without expected TNC conservation status